The Nano-Science Center is a center at the University of Copenhagen dedicated to the teaching and research of nanotechnology.

The Nano-Science Center was inaugurated in 2001 in a cooperation between the Niels Bohr Institute (physics) and the Department of Chemistry. It resides in the D block of the interconnected Hans Christian Ørsted Building complex.

The current chairman is professor Bo Wegge Laursen.

A new undergraduate program (3 years ending with a B.Sc. in nanotechnology) admitted the first students in September 2002, currently admitting about 60 students per year. Graduates are expected to continue to get a M.Sc. within a subfield of nanotechnology.

Research 

Current research includes theoretical and experimental nanophysics, synchrotron x-ray scattering, supramolecular surface chemistry, organic synthesis, biophysics, nanocontainers, molecular electronic properties and molecular biology.

Nanoflake 
Nanoflake has been discovered in the Center. It is a perfect crystalline structure that also absorbs all light.  Nanoflakes have the potential to convert up to 30 per cent of the solar energy into electricity, which is similar to present day solar cells. It can reduce the solar cell production costs because it uses less of the expensive semiconducting silicon in the process, due to the use of nanotechnology.

See also 

 Niels Bohr Institute

References

External links 
Homepage of the Nano-Science Center

University of Copenhagen
Nanotechnology institutions
Research institutes in Denmark
Solar cells